, styled on-screen as Lost Word of JeNnY, is a map-based action video game for the Family Computer which was released in 1987.

Summary

Gameplay information
In the actual stages of the game, it reverts to a side scrolling view. The map mode is similar to the map mode in the Teenage Mutant Ninja Turtles video game. The game was released on March 25, 1987 and gives the player three lives to solve their quest.

Characters
 Jenny
 She is the protagonist based on a then-popular doll in Japan.
 Blackie
 He is a killer.
 Chu
 A rat with a lovely face but a bad character.
 God of Death Skeleton
 He is the messenger from Hell.
 Pumpkin Man
 The man is wearing a pumpkin on his head.
 Frogman
 He is the frog from the Flower Land.
 Bibi Order
 They are dressed in KKK-style clothes. A collection of the world's most powerful evil.

References

1987 video games
Japan-exclusive video games
Nintendo Entertainment System games
Nintendo Entertainment System-only games
Takara video games
Video games based on Takara Tomy toys
Video games developed in Japan
Video games featuring female protagonists